Inka Pukara (Aymara and Quechua Inka Inca, pukara fortress, "Inka fortress", also spelled Inca Pucara) is a  mountain in the Bolivian Andes. It is located in the Cochabamba Department, Arque Province, Tacopaya Municipality, southeast of Tacopaya.

References 

Mountains of Cochabamba Department